, also known by  and his Chinese style name , was a prince of Ryukyu Kingdom.

Prince Yuntanza was the second son of King Shō Kei, and was a full-brother of King Shō Boku. He was given Yuntanza magiri (modern Yomitan) as his hereditary fief, and established a new royal family: Yuntanza Udun.

Prince Yuntanza was dispatched together with Wakugawa Chōkyō (also known by Shō Hōten ) in 1764 to celebrate Tokugawa Ieharu succeeded as shōgun of the Tokugawa shogunate. They sailed back in the next year.

He served as sessei from 1770 to 1785.

References

|-

1745 births
1811 deaths
Princes of Ryūkyū
Sessei
People of the Ryukyu Kingdom
Ryukyuan people
18th-century Ryukyuan people
19th-century Ryukyuan people